America's Best Dance Crew All-Stars: Road to the VMAs was the eighth season of the competitive dance reality television series America's Best Dance Crew. The revival of the series was announced by MTV on January 10, 2015, following the show's cancellation in 2012. The season, which premiered on July 29, 2015, was hosted by television presenter Jason Dundas. The season consisted of six MTV Video Music Award–themed episodes; the winner was crowned in a live episode finale airing before the 2015 MTV Video Music Awards. Hip hop artist T-Pain, recording artist Teyana Taylor, and Broadway performer Frankie Grande formed the new judging panel.

Cast
The eighth season of America's Best Dance Crew features six dance crews, including five previous winners. The past champions are joined by one new dance crew, which includes members from Season 1 winner JabbaWockeeZ and fellow competitors Kaba Modern.

Results

: The bottom crew from the first episode battled the bottom crew from the second episode to determine the first elimination of the season.
: All three crews advanced to the final episode.
Key
 (WINNER) The dance crew won the competition and was crowned "America's Best Dance Crew All-Star Champion".
 (RUNNER-UP) The dance crew was the runner-up in the competition.
 (IN) The dance crew was safe from elimination.
 (RISK) The dance crew was at risk for elimination.
 (OUT) The dance crew was eliminated from the competition.

Episodes

Episode 1: All-Star Showdown
Original Airdate: July 29, 2015
The season kicked off with all six crews dancing alongside American R&B singer, Ne-Yo, to a medley of his own songs including '"She Knows", "Coming with You", and "Time of Our Lives". Then, the crews incorporated hits from VMA-nominated artists into their routines. All six crews advanced to the next round, but We Are Heroes were put at risk and set to face elimination against another crew in the next episode.

Safe: Super CR3W, I.aM.mE, Elektrolytes, Kinjaz, Quest Crew
Bottom: We Are Heroes

Episode 2: VMA Icons Challenge
Original Airdate: August 5, 2015
The episode started off with all six crews dancing to a master mix of "Started from the Bottom" by Canadian rapper Drake. Then, each crew was assigned a VMA Icon and chose a track from their legendary catalog.

Safe: I.aM.mE, Super CR3W, Kinjaz, Quest Crew
Bottom 2: We Are Heroes, Elektrolytes
Eliminated: We Are Heroes

Episode 3: VMA Fashion Challenge
Original Airdate: August 12, 2015
The episode started off with the remaining crews performing a martial arts-inspired dance to a master mix of "Bad Blood" by Taylor Swift featuring Kendrick Lamar. The crews were then given a challenge to incorporate fashion and wardrobe into their routines.

Safe: Super CR3W, Kinjaz, I.aM.mE
Bottom 2: Elektrolytes, Quest Crew
Eliminated:  Elektrolytes

Episode 4: Crews' Control Challenge
Original Airdate: August 19, 2015
The four remaining crews competed against each other in two challenges: the VMA Megacrew Challenge, in which each crew was split into teams of two and given the task of creating a routine that would keep them from the bottom two, and the Crews' Control Challenge, where the remaining crews were given artistic freedom to create a routine that would save them from elimination.

At the end of the episode, Di "Moon" Zhang of I.aM.mE proposed to his girlfriend on stage, to which she accepted and the couple became engaged.

Challenge #1: VMA Megacrew Challenge
The remaining four crews were split into two teams of two crews and each team was given the task to create a unique dance number together. The crews in the team chosen by the judges would be safe, while the other team would make up the bottom two for the next challenge.

Challenge #2: Crews' Control Challenge
The four remaining crews were given full freedom to use lighting, camera work, stage layout, etc. to create a unique performance of their very own.

Safe: Kinjaz, Super CR3W
Bottom 2: I.aM.mE, Quest Crew
Eliminated:  I.aM.mE

Episode 5: Semi Finals
Original Airdate: August 26, 2015
The three remaining crews competed against each other in two challenges: the VMA Nominee Challenge, where they chose a VMA-nominated song to perform to in order to stay safe from elimination this week, and the Final Statement Challenge, where, like previous seasons' Last Chance Challenge, the crews chose a song to perform to in a bid to win the competition.

In a surprise twist, it was revealed the judges made the decision of sending all three remaining crews straight to the finale.

Challenge #1: VMA Nominee Challenge
The remaining three crews chose a VMA-nominated song to perform a routine to in order to advance to the finals.

Challenge #2: Final Statement
Similar to previous seasons, the remaining three crews were given one last chance to perform before voting lines opened up for the finale.

Episode 6: VMA Pre-Party Finale
Original Airdate: August 29, 2015
The episode started off with the remaining three finalists dancing alongside the eliminated crews to a master mix of "All That" by Dillon Francis featuring Twista and The Rej3ctz. The three finalists then performed one last routine before the winner was officially announced.

Eliminated:  Super CR3W
Runner-Up: Kinjaz
Winner: Quest Crew

References

External links
  

2015 American television seasons
America's Best Dance Crew